Sergey Viktorovich Chizhov (born March 16, 1964, Moscow) is a Russian political figure and a deputy of the 4th, 5th, 6th, 7th, and 8th State Dumas.

Political career 
Chizhov started his political career in 1997 when he first ran in the local elections of the Voronezh City Council. From 2001 to 2003, he was a deputy of the Voronezh Oblast Duma. From 2003 to 2015, Chizhov was a prominent member of the Federal Assembly in the Parliamentary Assembly of the Organization for Security and Co-operation in Europe. Since 2003, he has been constantly re-elected as a deputy for the State Duma of the Russian Federation.

Awards 

 Medal of the Order "For Merit to the Fatherland"

References

1964 births
Living people
United Russia politicians
21st-century Russian politicians
Fourth convocation members of the State Duma (Russian Federation)
Fifth convocation members of the State Duma (Russian Federation)
Sixth convocation members of the State Duma (Russian Federation)
Seventh convocation members of the State Duma (Russian Federation)
Eighth convocation members of the State Duma (Russian Federation)